Azaghal may refer to:
 Azaghâl, a fictional dwarf in J. R. R. Tolkien's Middle-earth writings
 Azaghal (band), a Finnish black metal band